An energy park is a separate area used and planned for the purpose of clean energy development, like wind and solar generation facilities.

Energy parks create many other economic development benefits too.  In Ohio, energy parks are creating thousands of green jobs. In Minnesota, community wind parks are also popular. In England, wind parks are commonly known as wind farms.  A more "lightweight" version of an energy park is a wind park or solar park.  These have one type of clean energy generation, rather than two or more technologies, as in an energy park.  

Some energy parks feature additional features beyond clean energy generation.  Additional benefits include: green job creation, Smart grid connections, as well as new recreational, technology innovation and agricultural opportunities.  The Stamford Energy Park in Vermont is one example of an integrated energy park.

See also
Mega-Site

Notes

Industrial parks
Sustainable technologies